Majesta or majestas may refer to:

 Majesta (tissue brand), a brand of Irving Tissue
 Toyota Crown Majesta, a car
 Law of majestas, several ancient Roman laws

See also
 Toyota Majesty, a light commercial vehicle